Sud, also known as South, is a 1993 Italian drama film directed by Gabriele Salvatores.

The movie won the Best Score award and was nominated for Best Original Story at the 1994 Nastro d'Argento ceremony. It also won the Best Sound award and was nominated for Best Score at the 1994 David di Donatello. For his performance, Silvio Orlando was nominated for the 1994 David di Donatello for Best Actor.

Plot
During a warm springy Sunday afternoon in a small town of South Italy, the opening of the polling place is disrupted by three Italian citizens and one Eritrean, who are unemployed, angry and armed. They threaten to occupy the school designed for the poll. They start to negotiate with the police, but eventually the four men are forced to leave.

Cast
Silvio Orlando: Ciro
Gigio Alberti: Gianni
Claudio Bisio: Giacomo Fiori
Renato Carpentieri: Cannavacciuolo
Antonio Catania: Elia
Marco Manchisi: Michele
Ighèzu Mussiè: Munir
Francesca Neri: Lucia
Antonio Petrocelli: Colonel

Reception
The film performed well in the run up to Christmas grossing over $3 million in Italy.

See also      
 List of Italian films of 1993

References

External links 

Sud at Variety Distribution

1993 films
Films directed by Gabriele Salvatores
Italian drama films
1990s Italian-language films
Colorado Films films
1990s Italian films